Lambert II, Count of Lens (died 1054) was a French nobleman. He was likely born circa 1030. This would put his death age at about 24 years old.

He was the son of Eustace I, Count of Bologne and of Maud of Louvain (daughter of Lambert I of Louvain).  he married Adelaide of Normandy, Countess of Aumale, daughter of Robert I, Duke of Normandy and sister of William the Conqueror. Adelaide was the widow of Enguerrand II, Count of Ponthieu who died in 1053.  Lambert and Adelaide had a daughter, Judith of Lens, although Lambert would scarcely have seen her; he was killed at the battle of Lille in 1054. Lambert was supporting Baldwin V, Count of Flanders against Henry III, Holy Roman Emperor when he was killed in battle. His widow, Adelaide, married thirdly, Odo, Count of Champagne.

References

1054 deaths
House of Boulogne
Counts of Lens
Counts of Aumale
Military personnel killed in action
Year of birth unknown